Christopher Hamilton (born 21 November 1987) is a Scottish football manager and former player who played for Livingston, Dumbarton, Stirling Albion, Queen's Park and Albion Rovers.

Playing career
Hamilton was a product of the Livingston youth academy, but left in 2006 without making a first team appearance. He joined Scottish Third Division club Dumbarton, and made his debut on 9 September 2006, in a 2–0 win against Elgin City. He scored his first goal for the club on 4 November, in a 2–0 win against Berwick Rangers, and was a half-time substitute in Dumbarton’s 4–0 loss to Celtic in the Scottish Cup third-round, on 6 January 2007. Hamilton joined Scottish Second Division club Stirling Albion in August 2008. He scored a hat-trick against Stranraer on 24 January 2009, in a 2–8 win. Hamilton joined Scottish Third Division club Queen's Park in August 2009, before joining Albion Rovers in May 2010, helping the club win the 2010–11 Second Division play-offs, before retiring in 2012.

Managerial Career
After retiring, Hamilton became 1st Team Coach with Spalding United in 2016.  He left the position in 2017 to become manager of Lincoln City Women, winning the 2017–18 East Midlands Premier Division. A two year spell as manager of Barnsley Women followed from 2018 to 2020, before becoming York City Ladies manager in July 2020. 

Under his guidance York won the 2021–22  North East Premier Division. Hamilton left York City Ladies in June 2022.

Honours

Player
Albion Rovers
Scottish Football League Second Division play-offs: 2010–11

Manager
Lincoln City Women
East Midlands Premier Division: 2017–18
York City Ladies
 North East Premier Division: 2021–22

References

1987 births
Scottish footballers
Dumbarton F.C. players
Albion Rovers F.C. players
Stirling Albion F.C. players
Queen's Park F.C. players
Stranraer F.C. players
Livingston F.C. players
Scottish Football League players
Living people
Place of birth missing (living people)
Association football midfielders